Rhizophora harrisonii is a species of plant in the family Rhizophoraceae. It can be found in Brazil, Cameroon, Colombia, Costa Rica, Ecuador, Guyana, French Guiana, Honduras, Nicaragua, Panama, Suriname, Trinidad, Tobago, and Venezuela.

Plants of the World Online considers it a naturally-occurring hybrid of Rhizophora mangle and Rhizophora racemosa, as Rhizophora x harrisonii.

Description 
It is a tree that reaches a size of up to 20 m high. It has elliptical leaves, 11–15 cm long and 4–7 cm wide, the acute apex, the cuneate base, glabrous, undersides with black dots. The inflorescence of 5–12 cm long, 3-5 times branched, with many flowers, peduncle 2–7 cm long, with bracts thick, bifid; pedicels 3–11 mm long, flowers 1 cm long; stamens 8; oval or slightly elliptical floral bud, acute apex. Oval-lanceolate fruit, 4 cm long and 1.5 cm wide, radicle 11–25 cm long.

Distribution and habitat 
Rhizophora harrisonii is native to both the Tropical Atlantic and the Tropical Eastern Pacific. In the Atlantic basin it ranges along the Atlantic coast of Africa from Angola to Senegal, and along the Atlantic, Caribbean, and Gulf of Mexico coasts of South and Central America from northeastern Brazil to eastern Mexico. In the eastern Pacific it ranges from southern Mexico to Peru.

Being a component of the mangrove communities, gentleman mangroves are usually associated with other mangrove species such as Avicennia tonduzii Moldenke, Avicennia bicolor Stand., Avicennia germinans (L.) L., Avicennia schaueriana Stapt & Leechm., Laguncularia racemosa (L.) Gaertn. f., Pelliciera rhizophorae Tr. & Pl. And Rhizophora mangle L.

Taxonomy 
Rhizophora harrisonii was described by Alleyne Leechman and published in Bulletin of Miscellaneous Information Kew 1918 (1): 8, f. A, in the year 1918.

Etymology 
Rhizophora : generic name that derives from the Greek words: ριζα (rhiza), which means "root" and φορος (phoros), which means "support", referring to the piles of the base.

harrisonii: epithet awarded in honor of the director of the Director of Science and Agriculture in British Guiana, Sir John Bunchmore Harrison.

References 

harrisonii
Tropical Atlantic flora
Tropical Eastern Pacific flora